Lorenzenite is a rare sodium titanium silicate mineral with the formula Na2Ti2Si2O9 It is an orthorhombic mineral, variously found as colorless, grey, pinkish, or brown crystals.

It was first identified in 1897 in rock samples from Narsarsuk, Greenland. In 1947 it was discovered to be the same as the mineral ramsayite (now a synonym of lorenzenite), discovered in the 1920s in the Kola peninsula of Russia. It is also found in northern Canada.

It occurs in nepheline syenites and pegmatites in association with aegirine, nepheline, microcline, arfvedsonite, elpidite, loparite, eudialyte, astrophyllite, mangan-neptunite, lavenite, rinkite, apatite, titanite and ilmenite.

It was named in honor of Danish mineralogist Johannes Theodor Lorenzen (1855–1884).

References

Titanium minerals
Inosilicates
Orthorhombic minerals
Minerals in space group 60